Brian Evan Anthony Davies  (born 1951) is a British philosopher, Roman Catholic priest, and friar. He is Distinguished Professor of Philosophy, Fordham University (since 1995), and author of An Introduction to the Philosophy of Religion, now in its fourth English edition, which has been translated into five languages.

Education
Brian Davies studied theology at the University of Bristol (BA 1972) and undertook graduate studies at King's College London (MTh, 1973; Tutorial Assistant, 1974–6; PhD, 1976).

Teaching
He spent the period 1982–95 at the University of Oxford. Throughout those years he was lecturer in theology and philosophy at Blackfriars, Oxford. Davies was also Tutor in Theology, St Benet's Hall and a member of the Faculty of Theology (1983–95); Regent of Studies of the English Dominican Province (1988–95); University Research Lecturer (1993–95); and member of the Sub-Faculty of Philosophy (1994–95).

In 1994 Davies was appointed Regent of Blackfriars and, as a Head of House, received the degree of Master of Arts by Special Decree by the University of Oxford. In 1995 he took up his current appointment at Fordham University. He held Visiting Professorships at the Beda College, Rome (Spring 1987 and Spring 1988), Fordham University (July–August 1987, July–August 1988, and Fall 1994), and Candler School of Theology, Emory University (Spring 1993).

Problem of evil

Davies takes influence from Thomas Aquinas and is a proponent of classical theism. To solve the problem of evil, Davies has argued that God is not a person or moral agent and is therefore not responsible for evil. God the creator and sustainer of the universe is not existent among others so cannot be expected to conform to moral standards external to himself. In 2008, Davies stated:

Notable writings and editorial work

As author

An Introduction to the Philosophy of Religion (Oxford University Press: Oxford, 1982; revised edition, 1993; 3rd edition 2003; 4th edition 2020; Korean translation, 1996; Romanian translation, 1996; Ukrainian translation, 1996; Hungarian translation, 1999; Polish translation 2006)
Thinking About God (Geoffrey Chapman: London, 1985)
The Thought of Thomas Aquinas (Oxford University Press: Oxford, 1992)
Aquinas (Continuum: London and New York, 2002)
Aquinas: An Introduction (Continuum: London and New York, 2003)
The Reality of God and the Problem of Evil (Continuum: London and New York, 2006)
Thomas Aquinas on God and Evil (Oxford University Press: Oxford, 2011)

He has also contributed:
 more than twenty chapters or articles to books
 more than seventy articles in scholarly journals including New Blackfriars, The Downside Review, The Clergy Review, Irish Theological Quarterly, The Monist, Philosophy, Theology, Cogito, International Philosophical Quarterly, Sophia, Revue Internationale de Philosophie, and Think
 book reviews in Anglican Theological Review, Faith and Philosophy, Journal of Theological Studies, The Philosophical Review, Theology Today, and The Thomist
 numerous contributions in The Times, The Tablet, and the Times Literary Supplement.

As editor

Language, Meaning and God: Essays in honour of Herbert McCabe O.P. (Geoffrey Chapman: London, 1987)
With G.R. Evans, Anselm of Canterbury: The Major Works (Oxford University Press: Oxford, 1998)
Philosophy of Religion: A Guide to the Subject (Geoffrey Chapman: London, 1998)
Philosophy of Religion: A Guide and Anthology (Oxford University Press: Oxford, 2000)
The De Malo of Thomas Aquinas (tr. Richard Regan; ed., Introduction, and Notes Brian Davies) (Oxford University Press: New York and Oxford, 2001)
Thomas Aquinas: Contemporary Philosophical Perspectives (Oxford University Press: New York and Oxford, 2002)
With Brian Leftow, The Cambridge Companion to Anselm (Cambridge University Press: Cambridge, 2004)
Aquinas's “Summa Theologiae”: Critical Essays (Rowman and Littlefield: Lanham, Boulder, New York, Toronto, Oxford, 2005)
With Brian Leftow, Aquinas: “Summa Theologiae”, Questions on God (Cambridge University Press: Cambridge 2006)
With Eleonore Stump, The Oxford Handbook of Aquinas (Oxford University Press, 2012)

Davies also edits the Outstanding Christian Thinkers series (Continuum: London and New York, 1989–2004), having overseen the publication of twenty-eight volumes, and of the Great Medieval Thinkers, published by Oxford University Press. He was Book Reviews Editor for New Blackfriars (1979–95) and a member of the editorial board for Religious Studies (2000–6). He is now Associate European Editor (since 1992) for the International Philosophical Quarterly.

As literary executor for the late Herbert McCabe (died 2001), Davies edited and published five volumes of work that McCabe left at the time of his death: God Still Matters (Continuum: London and New York, 2002); God, Christ and Us (Continuum: London and New York, 2003); The Good Life: Ethics and the Pursuit of Happiness (Continuum: London and New York, 2005); Faith Within Reason (Continuum: London and New York, 2007); and On Aquinas (Continuum: London and New York, 2008).

Bibliography

Books 
 
 Thinking About God (Geoffrey Chapman: London, 1985)
 The Thought of Thomas Aquinas (Oxford University Press: Oxford, 1992)
 Aquinas (Continuum: London and New York, 2002)
 Aquinas: An Introduction (Continuum: London and New York, 2003)
 The Reality of God and the Problem of Evil (Continuum: London and New York, 2006)
 Thomas Aquinas on God and Evil (Oxford University Press: Oxford, 2011)
 Thomas Aquinas's Summa Theologiae: A Guide and Commentary (Oxford University Press: Oxford, 2014)
Edited
 Language, Meaning and God: Essays in honour of Herbert McCabe O.P. (Geoffrey Chapman: London, 1987)
 With G.R. Evans, Anselm of Canterbury: The Major Works (Oxford University Press: Oxford, 1998)
 Philosophy of Religion: A Guide to the Subject (Geoffrey Chapman: London, 1998)
 Philosophy of Religion: A Guide and Anthology (Oxford University Press: Oxford, 2000)
 The De Malo of Thomas Aquinas (tr. Richard Regan; ed., Introduction, and Notes Brian Davies) (Oxford University Press: New York and Oxford, 2001)
 Thomas Aquinas: Contemporary Philosophical Perspectives (Oxford University Press: New York and Oxford, 2002)
 With Brian Leftow, The Cambridge Companion to Anselm (Cambridge University Press: Cambridge, 2004)
 Aquinas's “Summa Theologiae”: Critical Essays (Rowman and Littlefield: Lanham, Boulder, New York, Toronto, Oxford, 2005)
 With Brian Leftow, Aquinas: “Summa Theologiae”, Questions on God (Cambridge University Press: Cambridge 2006)
 With Eleonore Stump, The Oxford Handbook of Aquinas (Oxford University Press, 2012)

Articles 
 
 
———————
Notes

References

1951 births
Living people
20th-century British philosophers
20th-century British Roman Catholic theologians
20th-century English Roman Catholic priests
21st-century British philosophers
21st-century English Roman Catholic priests
21st-century British Roman Catholic theologians
Academics of the University of Oxford
Alumni of King's College London
Alumni of the University of Bristol
Analytic philosophers  
Analytical Thomists
Analytic theologians
Catholic philosophers
English Dominicans
Fordham University faculty
New Blackfriars people
Philosophers of religion
Regents of Blackfriars, Oxford